The 2009–10 Women's EHF Cup was the 29th edition of the competition. It was won by Randers HK, beating Spanish runner-up CBF Elda in the final. This was the sixth trophy won by a Danish club, now leading the rankings, and the second international title for Randers, which had previously won the 2000 EHF Challenge Cup.

First qualifying round

Second qualifying round

Round of 32

Round of 16

Quarter-finals

Semifinals

Final

Top goalscorers

References

Women's EHF Cup
2009 in women's handball
2010 in women's handball